The Mount Zion Methodist Episcopal Church is a historic Methodist church located in Union Township, Delaware County, Indiana.  It was built in 1867, and is a modest, one-room, brick church with a reconstructed bell tower.  It measures 46 feet by 36 feet and sits on an uncut Indiana limestone foundation.

It was added to the National Register of Historic Places in 2008.

References

Churches on the National Register of Historic Places in Indiana
Churches completed in 1867
Methodist churches in Indiana
National Register of Historic Places in Delaware County, Indiana
Churches in Delaware County, Indiana